Xuzhou Construction Machinery Group Co., Ltd. (XCMG Group) is a Chinese multinational state-owned heavy machinery manufacturing company with headquarters in Xuzhou, Jiangsu. Founded in 1989, XCMG currently ranks first in the Chinese construction machinery industry, 3rd in the world, 4th in China's top 100 machinery enterprises, and 409th in the world's top 500 brands. Recently the company has taken over Schwing GmbH. Schwing a German manufacturer of mobile and stationary concrete pumps and truck mixers, headquartered in Herne, as well as the parent company of Schwing Stetter, based in Memmingen. The business group is the world's second largest concrete pump manufacturer, behind Putzmeister, another German manufacturer and subsidiary of the Sany Group. 

XCMG Group’s subsidiary, XCMG Construction Machinery Co. Ltd., was listed on the Shenzhen Stock Exchange SZSE: 000425 in 1996. With the largest scale, highest technical level and largest export volume in the Chinese construction machinery industry, XCMG Group is a competitive and influential hundred billion enterprise.

Taking "XCMG For Your Success" as its core direction for development, the word "Your" not only includes end-users but also the greater community of interest such as shareholders, suppliers, employees, and society. Constantly adhering to the concept of sustainable development, XCMG is committed to creating a greater value for the community and provide more value-added services for the entire value chain.

XCMG products are sold in more than 180 countries and regions and cover 97% of the countries along the Belt and Road Initiative. The group holds a worldwide sales network including more than 20 manufacturing bases in China, 300 overseas distributors, over 2,000 service centers, 40 overseas offices, and more than 30 overseas branch companies. 

The group has R&D centers, manufacturing bases or KD factories in more than 10 countries including Germany, United States, Brazil, and India, and has acquired 3 European companies including Schwing. It is now the top concrete machinery brand in developed markets of Europe and the United States. Meanwhile, XCMG’s manufacturing base in Brazil has become a model of China-Brazil economic cooperation, as the XCMG Brazilian Bank is now the first overseas bank of China’s manufacturing industry.

Name
The name "XCMG" is an acronym of "Xuzhou Construction Machinery Group".

History

Before 1989

In 1943, one of the predecessors of XCMG Group, "Huaxing Iron Factory" was founded and later became Xuzhou Heavy Machinery Factory. 

In 1948 and 1949, Jinan Meifeng Pound Factory and Xuzhou Shunhe Auto Repair Shop were established and later developed as Xuzhou Construction Machinery Manufacturing Factory and Xuzhou Loader Factory respectively. All three factories played an important role in contributing to the development of XCMG Group today.

In 1957, the Huaxing Iron Factory completes trial production of its first tower crane, paving the way for XCMG's construction machinery business later on.

In 1960, China's first 10-tonne steamroller is developed.

In 1963, China's first 5-tonne truck crane is developed.

1989 to 1999

In March 1989, XCMG Group was officially established in Xuzhou with the "three factories, one institute" model (Xuzhou Heavy Machinery Factory, Xuzhou Loader Factory, Xuzhou Construction Machinery Manufacturing Factory and Xuzhou Construction Machinery Research Institute), becoming the first group company in the Chinese construction industry.

In 1992, then-General Secretary of the Chinese Communist Party (CCP) Jiang Zemin inspected XCMG. It also became the first company in the industry to obtain the right to export independently, officially kicking off its prelude to internationalization. That same year, XCMG participated in the Bauma Exhibition in Germany as the first and only Chinese machinery exhibitor.

In 1993, Xuzhou Construction Machinery Co., Ltd. was established.

In 1994, XCMG and Caterpillar formed a joint venture, namely Caterpillar (Xuzhou) Co., Ltd.

In 1995, XCMG and Liebherr Group formed a joint venture, namely Xuzhou Liebherr Concrete Machinery Co., Ltd. Meanwhile, the company was restructured into a wholly state-owned enterprise, namely Xuzhou Construction Machinery Group Co., Ltd.

In 1996, XCMG was listed on the Shenzhen Stock Exchange SZSE: 000425, while forming a joint venture with Rockwell (Xuzhou Rockwell Axle Co., Ltd.). That year, then-CCP Politburo Standing Committee member Hu Jintao inspected XCMG.

In 1997, XCMG was listed as one of the 100 modern enterprise system pilot enterprises and 120 national-level enterprise group pilot units, while Xuzhou Construction Machinery Group Import and Export Co., Ltd. was established with the approval of the Ministry of Foreign Economic Relations.

2011 to Present

In 2011, XCMG launched its "Hanfeng Plan", reforming its strategic management model with 5 business units. The group also signed an agreement with the Venezuelan government to establish a local construction equipment manufacturing joint-venture company. Meanwhile, XCMG merged with two high-end hydraulic technology providers, AMCA (Netherlands) and Fluitronics (Germany). That year, XCMG ranked 5th in the global construction machinery industry.

In 2012, XCMG's 4 major industrial bases were completed and put into full production under the business unit system, in addition to the completion of the 1-billion RMB Jiangsu Xuzhou Construction Machinery Research Institute. Meanwhile, new manufacturing facilities in Xuzhou for all-terrain cranes, wheeled loaders, concrete pumps, and other concrete machineries were completed at a cost of US$1.9 billion. Occupying around 2 million square meters, the facilities are able to build 5,000 large and medium capacity cranes, 40,000 wheeled loaders and 20,000 units of concrete machinery annually. XCMG also began the construction of a 16,400 square meter research and development facility in Krefeld, Germany; along with a merger with the world-leading German concrete machinery company Schwing.
 
Product-wise, XCMG's 3,600-tonne, 88,000 tonne-meter rated lattice boom crawler crane for power generation plants and petrochemical facilities began its production that year. By the end of the year, the world's largest all-terrain crane, QAY1600, made its grand debut, while the XGC88000 sets a new record for heaviest crawler crane lift with a successful lift of 4500 tonnes in overload tests. That year, XCMG ranked first in the global mobile crane industry. With operating income exceeding 100 billion RMB, XCMG ranked first in the Chinese construction machinery industry.

In 2013, XCMG Europe GmbH, XCMG European Research Center in Düsseldorf, Germany as well as XCMG European Purchasing Center were established. The group independently developed the world's first 4000-tonne crawler crane, creating several world records. Meanwhile, XCMG Group Finance Co., Ltd. was established hence officially entered the financial service industry. That year, XCMG received the Best Investment Award from the North Rhine-Westphalia state of Germany.

In 2014, XCMG won the highest award in China's industrial sector—China Industry Awards. That year, the group's first wholly-owned overseas subsidiary, the 200-million USD XCMG Brazil Manufacturing Base, was completed and put into production. It then received the Best Business Award from the municipality of Pouso Alegre, Brazil. XCMG American Research Center in Minnesota, USA was established. Meanwhile, Jiangsu XCMG Information Technology Co., Ltd. was established as the first subsidiary in XCMG Group to adopt a mixed-ownership system.

In 2015, XCMG Heavy Trucks Base and XCMG Environmental Xuzhou Base were completed and put into production respectively. The XCMG Xuzhou Sanitation Machinery Factory was established, as well as the introduction of the upgraded XCMG Xuzhou Heavy Truck Factory. That year, XCMG received the China Corporate Social Responsibility Achievement Awards and the Green China Environmental Achievement Awards.

In 2016, XCMG launched the XCMG DE400 modern dump truck model. With a capacity of no less than 400 tonnes (empty), it was the largest land vehicle in the world as well as the largest Chinese construction vehicle ever built and was considered a world record by many. That year, XCMG's export destination increased to 177 countries and regions. 

In 2017, then-CCP general secretary Xi Jinping inspected XCMG.

In 2018, XCMG ranked 6th among the top 50 construction machinery companies in the world and was the only Chinese company that has been included among the top ten for 7 consecutive years. That year, the XCMG 700-ton hydraulic excavator XE7000E, China's largest tonnage hydraulic excavator was launched, making China the world's 4th hydraulic excavator with R&D and manufacturing country with capabilities above 700 tons after Germany, Japan, and the United States. Meanwhile, the XCA1600 all-terrain crane was successfully developed with the highest lifting capacity in the world. 

In 2019, the XCA1600 all-terrain crane completed the world's highest 140-meter onshore wind power installation.

In 2021, XCMG and Vale sign a partnership for autonomous equipment. Vale's press office reported that it has signed a Memorandum of Understanding (MoU) with XCMG Construction Machinery Limited (XCMG Machinery). The objective is the potential supply of mining and infrastructure equipment, including zero-emission and autonomous equipment.

Products

XCMG’s key product lines cover 16 categories and 3 key components (hydraulic, transmission, and electronic control), including hoisting machinery, excavating machinery, concrete machinery, mining machinery, soil shovel and transportation machinery, road machinery, special vehicles, aerial work machinery, piling machinery, trenchless machinery, tunnel machinery, environmental protection machinery, fire safety machinery, energy drilling and mining machinery, port machinery and more. 

Today, the cumulative sales of XCMG exceed 1 million machines. 11 of its key products’ market share ranks first in the domestic industry, whereas XCMG’s mobile cranes, piling machinery sets, concrete machinery, construction and maintenance machinery rank first in the world.

References

External links
 XCMG Group
 XCMG, website in spanish

Companies based in Jiangsu
Manufacturing companies established in 1989
Construction equipment manufacturers of China
Multinational companies headquartered in China
Chinese brands
Government-owned companies of China
1989 establishments in China